The 2010 Mackay Cutters season was the third in the club's history. Coached by Paul Bramley and captained by Jardine Bobongie, they competed in the QRL's Intrust Super Cup. The club qualified for the finals for the first time in their history, falling one game short of the Grand Final.

Season summary 
Paul Bramley, formerly of the Souths Logan Magpies, became the Cutters second head coach after the departure of Shane Muspratt. Muspratt, who retired as a player at the end of 2008, returned to the club as a player in 2010. Key signings for the club included Welsh international Neil Budworth, former Queensland representative Josh Hannay and North Sydney Bears New South Wales Cup utility Justin Hunt.

The club enjoyed their best season to date in 2010, winning 11 games in the regular season and finishing in sixth place, qualifying for the finals for the first time. In their first finals game, the Cutters upset the Sunshine Coast Sea Eagles 14–4 before losing to the Norths Devils 12–56 in the preliminary final. Prop Liam McDonald, a new recruit from Souths Logan, was named the club's Player of the Year, while North Queensland Cowboys contracted centre Donald Malone was selected for the Queensland Residents side.

Milestones 
 Round 13: The club scored 50 points for the first time.
 Round 22: The club qualified for their first finals series.

Squad List

2010 squad 

The following players contracted to the North Queensland Cowboys played for the Cutters in 2010: Mitchell Achurch, Isaak Ah Mau, Leeson Ah Mau, Shannon Gallant, Obe Geia, Ben Harris, Antonio Kaufusi, Donald Malone, Grant Rovelli and Arana Taumata.

Squad movement

Gains

Losses

Fixtures

Regular season

Finals

Statistics

Honours

Club 
 Player of the Year: Liam McDonald
 Sponsor's Player of the Year: Neil Budworth
 Rookie of the Year: Tyson Martin
 Club Person of the Year: Carolyn Craig

References 

2010 in Australian rugby league
2010 in rugby league by club
Mackay Cutters